Gamers Helping Gamers is an American nonprofit organization that assists aspiring college students who play the collectable card game Magic: The Gathering by awarding tuition scholarships.

Organization history 
A small group of dedicated Magic: The Gathering players founded Gamers Helping Gamers in 2012. Aspiring scholarship recipients can apply for the funds by submitting a FAFSA form, a High School Transcript, and a series of essay responses. As of 2013, the scholarship awards $5,000 a year for college.

Scholarship recipients 
2012: Dylan Fay, Douglas Johnson

2013: Isaac Goldstein

2014: Nathan Calvin, Brandi Mason, Kenneth Siry

2015: Lirek Kulik, Dylan Quinn

2016: Faolan Sugarman-Lash, Jacob Schliesman, Oliver Tiu

2017: August Peterson, Autumn Cook

2018: Carter Newman, Clay Spicklemire

2019: Jacob Maro, Roen Blanke

2020: Makena Waldron, David Phan

As of 2021, the board of directors of Gamers Helping Gamers is Timothy McKenna (President), Eric Berger (Secretary) Jon Finkel (Treasurer), Chris Pikula, Robert Maher, Jr., Matthew Wang, Daniel O'Mahoney-Schwartz, and Jamie Parke.

References

External links
Gamers Helping Gamers - How to apply

Awards established in 2012
Magic: The Gathering
Scholarships in the United States